The Hills is a planned community and census-designated place (CDP) in Bedminster and Bernards townships, Somerset County, New Jersey, United States. It was first listed as a CDP prior to the 2020 census.

The community is in northern Somerset County, in the southeast corner of Bedminster Township and the western corner of Bernards Township. It is bordered to the north by the borough of Far Hills, to the east by Liberty Corner, and to the south by Pluckemin. The Hills CDP has two sections of development: one, primarily in Bernards Township, that is atop the western end of Second Watchung Mountain, and the other, entirely in Bedminster Township, at the western base of the mountain.

Interstate 287 forms the northern and western limit of the CDP, with access from Exit 22 (U.S. Routes 202 and 206). Routes 202/206 lead north into the center of Bedminster and south through Pluckemin to Somerville.

Demographics

References 

Census-designated places in Somerset County, New Jersey
Census-designated places in New Jersey
Bedminster, New Jersey
Bernards Township, New Jersey